Ajax is an oil on canvas painting by the American artist John Steuart Curry, created in 1936-1937. It depicts a well-fed Hereford bull with two cowbirds on his back. The painting is on view at the Smithsonian American Art Museum, in Washington, D.C..

Creation
The painting was made with the intention to reassure Americans after the Dust Bowl years. According to Curry's friend Reginald Marsh, it was really a self-portrait.

Legacy
Curry featured Ajax the bull in several of his works, such as the mural Kansas Pastoral. The subject also became a target for mockery among those who opposed regionalist painting and considered it superficial. The satirist Marshall Glasier mocked both Ajax and Curry's position at the University of Wisconsin with his 1948 painting John Steuart Curry and the University of Wisconsin Bull-Breeding Machine.

Marianne Moore mentions Ajax in her poem "The Buffalo".

References

External links
 Presentation at the museum's website

1937 paintings
Animal paintings
Cattle in art
Paintings by John Steuart Curry
Paintings in the collection of the Smithsonian American Art Museum
Birds in art